Richard Elliott Parker (December 27, 1783September 10, 1840) was a lawyer, soldier, judge and politician in Virginia.  Parker served in the Virginia House of Delegates and the United States Senate, before later serving on the Virginia Supreme Court of Appeals.

Early and family life
Parker was born at ‘Rock Spring,’ Westmoreland County, Virginia, son of Captain William Harwar Parker and Mary (Sturman) Parker, and grandson of Judge Richard Parker and Elizabeth (Beale) Parker.  He studied law under his grandfather Parker at  ‘Lawfield,’ his grandfather's residence in Westmoreland County.

Career
After being admitted to the bar, he practiced in Westmoreland, his native county, which he twice represented in the Virginia House of Delegates, although when he was re-elected the vote contested, and the narrow loser would succeed to the seat in the next election.

During the War of 1812, Parker served as Lieutenant colonel in the Thirty-fifth Virginia Regiment Militia.  As such, he was in charge of the defense of the Northern Neck of Virginia from British incursions. On September 16, 1814, Parker was wounded during the British attack that resulted in the burning of Washington.

After the war, Parker returned to private legal  practice. The legislature elected him a judge of the general court on July 26, 1817. On December 12, 1836, Virginia legislators elected Judge Parker as the United States Senator from Virginia. A Jacksonian, he filled the vacancy caused by the resignation of Benjamin W. Leigh. Parker would resigned from the Senate on March 13, 1837, to accept a seat on the Virginia Supreme Court of Appeals (again elected by his former state legislative colleagues). He refused the cabinet office of United States Attorney General offered him by President Van Buren.

Death and legacy
Parker died on his estate, ‘Soldier’s Retreat,’ near Snickersville (now Bluemont, Clarke County), Virginia, September 10, 1840. He was buried alongside his wife, Elizabeth Foushee Parker at Grace Episcopal Church in Berryville, Virginia in the county of Clarke.

References

 Clarke County Historical Association, Berryville, Va. 
 Grace Episcopal Church Burial Records
 Find a Grave for Judge Richard E. Parker, Grace Episcopal Church, Berryville, Va.

External links

1783 births
1840 deaths
Democratic Party members of the Virginia House of Delegates
Democratic Party United States senators from Virginia
Virginia state court judges
Justices of the Supreme Court of Virginia
People from Westmoreland County, Virginia
Democratic-Republican Party United States senators
Virginia Democratic-Republicans
Virginia Jacksonians
19th-century American politicians
19th-century American judges